Rusty Moe is a classic rock/funk band from Chennai, India. They have been active with the present name since 2008 and have played in and around Chennai.

The band has been together under different names since 1997. The present line-up consists of Aakash Jacob (vocals), Timmy Elliot (guitar), Jonathan Tillich (bass guitar), Kevin P (keyboard) and Divyan Varghese (drums). 

Jacob, who is also a member of Chennai band Subject to Change, was hired as the singer in 2011 and the band immediately set about replacing all the old vocal tracks. During this process, the band also self-produced their first music video for their first single, "Wham Bam Thank You Ma'am". In 2015, few of the band members relocated to other countries and the band went through a brief period of lull. 

The Covid-19 crisis and the following lock-down saw the members reconnect and talk music again. Before long, it was decided to pick up the pieces and go ahead with the album. The present technology had made it possible to record remotely. Once the initial connections were rekindled, it was full steam ahead.

Mrs. Dickinson 
Through the initial few weeks of discussions, Rusty Moe initially had planned to release a full album comprising 10 tracks. However with the changing trend, it was decided to settle for the shorter 4 song EP, which is better suited to the present listening style. This means the band have enough songs ready for another EP, which shouldn't be too far off. The band decided to scrap all the old tracks and start from scratch. The working title for the EP was "Wham Bam", which was also the first single released by the band way back in 2009, and also happens to be the first song ever written by the band in the early days around 1998. The band also agreed to include the power ballad, "Dreams Untrue" which reflects a typical 80's style. Though this song was written in 2009, it has rarely been played Live. The other two tracks are relatively new and hardly been played Live and has changed in its format when it was reworked. 
Over the next few months, the band members have been sending each other reworked tracks and demos. With some members in Australia, Canada, and the rest in India, the distance and time difference made the work challenging. However, everyone was able to complete their parts and by early October 2020, the band completed recording four songs from scratch and around this time also decided to title the album as "Mrs Dickinson". The band decided to hand over mixing and mastering duties to Tobsgarage in Chennai, with Toby at the helm.

The songs are a mix of funk and classic rock and revolves around the stereotypical themes of Sex, Drugs, and Rock N' Roll. The album centers around the fictional character who goes by the name, Mrs. Dickinson, who is a middle aged woman, who isn't afraid to live a little, and who gets deeply involved with someone from the band and takes them on a hedonistic trip, which doesn't end well. The person regrets the choices he made and wants to return to his much quieter family life, but realizes that he has lost that forever in the process. As much as the EP explored themes of sex and drugs, towards the end it also explores certain emotions such as guilt, regret, resentment, forgiveness, grief and loss, etc.

The band commissioned local artist Kass Topping  to come up with the artwork, which reflects the overall theme of the EP and all songs on it.

Moe the Gecko, which has featured in all past band logo and artwork finds its way on this artwork as well, this time as a tattoo on the arm of Mrs. Dickinson.

The EP was finally released on 1st Feb 2021. Over few months, the EP notched up over 20k streams on Spotify and has been stable since.

Christmas With the Moes - EP 2020 
The band was the first in India to release a Christmas single. They recorded their version of the "Rockin' Around The Christmas Tree" in December 2008, which received a huge response from fans and others. With Jacob, the band released their second Christmas single in December 2011. It was a version of "Silver Bells" which was once again well received by fans. Both tracks are now available as an EP titled "Christmas with the Moes", released in 2020 on all major music platforms.

When both tracks were initially released, it was a new trend that had not caught up as yet, for rock bands to release Christmas songs. Rusty Moe pioneered this trend and since then many local bands have caught the Christmas spirit and have put out few tracks. Even few years after its release, both tracks continue to be very popular and receive good airplay over the Christmas period.

Sun Goes Down - Single 
With the success of the first EP, the band decided to keep the momentum going. The logistical challenges of being in 3 different continents made the band take the call to work on releasing singles rather than EP or an album, as this would be faster. With that decision the band were about to track their remaining singles when a personal tragedy struck one of the members and plans had to be put on hold for a while. When the band recommenced work, there was a new track that was presented, which is being recorded and due for release before the end of the year. The track, titled "Sun Goes Down" is a ballad, touching on themes like betrayal and estrangement, and was released on 29th April 2022 across all major streaming platforms.

External links 
 Rusty Moe on Reverbnation
 Rusty Moe blog
 Rusty Moe on YouTube
 He may be Rusty but he can Rock.
 Perfect Song For This Christmas

Indian rock music groups
Musical groups established in 2008